The Death Collectors & Spider's Shadow is a Big Finish Productions audio drama based on the long-running British science fiction television series Doctor Who. It contains a three-part story and a one-part story as well.

The Death Collectors

Plot
Death envelopes the planet of Antikon.  And it is sought after by the Dar Traders.

Cast
The Doctor — Sylvester McCoy
Professor Mors Alexandryn — Alastair Cording
Danika Meanwhile, — Katherine Parkinson
Smith Ridley/Dar Traders — Derek Carlyle
Nancy — Katarina Olsson

Spider's Shadow

Plot
At a royal ball on an alien world, time is out of joint.  And the spiders are breaking through.

Cast
The Doctor — Sylvester McCoy
Guard — Alastair Cording
Colonel — Derek Carlyle
Martial Princess Alison Keldafrian — Katarina Olsson
Martial Princess Louisa Keldafrian — Carol Fitzpatrick
Henry — Kevin McNally
Opera singer — Rebecca Bottone

Continuity
 The end of the Seventh Doctor's life in the TV movie is foreshadowed, including Puccini's Madama Butterfly which plays in his final moments.
 A prequel to this story is provided in the Fifth Doctor and Nyssa Companion Chronicles story The Darkening Eye, which also features the Dar Traders.

External links
Big Finish Productions – The Death Collectors

2008 audio plays
Seventh Doctor audio plays